Jealousy (Polish:Zazdrosc) is a 1922 Polish silent drama film directed by Wiktor Biegański and starring Zofia Jaroszewska, Mariusz Maszynski and Antoni Piekarski.

Cast
 Zofia Jaroszewska as Malgorzata Durerówna 
 Mariusz Maszynski as Feuerbach, teacher 
 Antoni Piekarski as Ludwik Durer, Malgorzata's father 
 Michał Waszyński as Teacher 
 Konstanty Meglicki as Parobek 
 Jerzy Starczewski as Malarz 
 Ignacy Miastecki   
 Stanislawa Slubicka

References

Bibliography
Skaff, Sheila. The history of cinema in Poland and the transition from silent to sound film, 1896-1939. University of Michigan., 2004.

External links

1922 films
1922 drama films
Polish drama films
Polish silent films
1920s Polish-language films
Films directed by Wiktor Bieganski
Polish black-and-white films
Silent drama films